Hypericum nanum is a species of flowering plant in the family Hypericaceae which is native to Lebanon, Syria, and Israel.

References 

nanum
Flora of Israel
Flora of Palestine (region)
Flora of Syria
Flora of Lebanon